John Joseph O'Connell (May 16, 1872 – May 14, 1908) was a baseball player for Major League Baseball.  His career was short, and he only played for two seasons.  During his two-season, he accumulated relatively poor statistics in very little playing time.  He played in only 16 games and had nine hits in 51 at bats for a batting average of .176.  At the age of 19, he made his professional debut on August 22, 1891 for the Baltimore Orioles near the end of their 1891 season in the last year of the American Association.  For the Orioles, he played second base, right field, and shortstop for a total of eight games.  The following year, O'Connell was not a member of the Orioles when they transferred to the National League in 1892.

He then disappeared for about 10 years but reappeared as a member of the Detroit Tigers for their 1902 season, where he played second base and twice at first base.  He joined the team late into the season and only played eight games. The Tigers struggled in their second season in the American League and were constantly changing their roster, which was largely filled with young, inexperienced, and inexpensive rookies.  The Tigers finished the season with a record 52–82–2 (.385) at 30½ games out of first place— one of the team's worst seasons in history.  O'Connell, like many other players from the 1902 Detroit Tigers, did not return to play the next year.  He died two days short of his 36th birthday in Derry, New Hampshire on May 14, 1908.

References

External links

Baseball Almanac statistics
John O’Connell profile at Sports Illustrated

1872 births
1908 deaths
19th-century baseball players
American expatriate baseball players in Canada
Baseball players from Massachusetts
Major League Baseball second basemen
Baltimore Orioles (AA) players
Detroit Tigers players
Sportspeople from Rockingham County, New Hampshire
Sportspeople from Lawrence, Massachusetts
People from Derry, New Hampshire
Lynn (minor league baseball) players
Mobile Blackbirds players
Chattanooga Chatts players
New Orleans Pelicans (baseball) players
Dover (minor league baseball) players
Worcester (minor league baseball) players
Bangor Millionaires players
Lewiston (minor league baseball) players
Quincy Bluebirds players
Cedar Rapids Bunnies players
Quincy Little Giants players
Ottumwa Giants players
Topeka Giants players
Utica Pentups players
Albany Senators players
Scranton Miners players
Omaha Omahogs players
Colorado Springs Millionaires players
Des Moines Hawkeyes players
Cedar Rapids Rabbits players
Evansville River Rats players
Milwaukee Brewers (minor league) players
Fort Wayne Railroaders players
Boise Fruit Pickers players
Seattle Siwashes players
Vancouver Veterans players